Jean Porter is an American theologian, currently the John A. O'Brien Endowed Professor of Theology at University of Notre Dame. To date, she has written "numerous articles and six books on the history of the Christian moral tradition and its contemporary relevance".

Porter received a BA in philosophy from The University of Texas in 1976, an M.Div. from Weston School of Theology in 1980, and a Ph.D. from Yale University in 1984.

Prior to teaching at Notre Dame, she taught at Vanderbilt Divinity School from 1984–1990.

She was President of the Society of Christian Ethics from 2005-2006 and serves on the editorial boards of the Journal for the Society of Christian Ethics, The Journal of Religious Ethics, and the Journal of the American Academy of Religion.

In 2012, she was elected to the American Academy of Arts and Sciences (AAAS). She gave the Stone lectures at Princeton in 2011 and the Gradwell Lecture at Liverpool Hope University in 2004.

Major works:

  Winner of a Catholic Press Association Book Award, 2011

References

Living people
University of Notre Dame faculty
American theologians
1955 births